KRGS (690 AM) is a radio station licensed to Rifle, Colorado, United States.  The station is owned by Western Slope Communications, LLC. The station has applied for a construction permit from the Federal Communications Commission to move to a new transmitter site, increase day power to 2,300 watts and increase night power to 16 watts.

The station was received via skywave in Laramie, Wyoming.

History
The station was assigned the call letters KWWS on April 4, 1987. On September 27, 1989, the station changed its call sign to KKGD and on April 21, 1994, to the current KRGS.

References

External links

RGS
ESPN Radio stations
Radio stations established in 1987